Italian Venezuelans are Venezuelan citizens of Italian descent. The word may refer to someone born in Venezuela of Italian descent or to someone who has emigrated to Venezuela from Italy. Italians were among the largest groups of European immigrants to settle in the country. Approximately 5 million Venezuelans have some degree of Italian ancestry.

Italians began arriving in Venezuela in massive numbers in the last half of the nineteenth and the first half of the twentieth centuries. Yet Italians began to transmit a sound cultural heritage, giving and receiving demonstrations of social empathy, which contributed to their integration and to the huge flows into Venezuela in 1947 and in 1948.

The massive presence of travelers, explorers, missionaries, and other peninsular and insular Italian immigrants over the course of almost 500 years made Venezuela acquire a Latin vocation instead of a Hispanic one. Italians also influenced Venezuelan accent, given its slight sing-songy intonation.

History
Before the discovery of huge deposits of oil in Venezuela, during the first half of the 20th century, the emigration of Italians to Venezuela was limited. A number of Italians moved to Venezuela from Italy during the colonial times as  Filippo Salvatore Gilii, José Cristóbal Roscio, Francisco Isnardi. In the Republican era of the 19th century there was a small number of Italians and their descendants who attained high status in Venezuelan society, such as Agostino Codazzi, Constante Ferrari, Carlos Luis Castelli and the surgeon Luis Razetti.

In the 1940s and 1950s the Dictatorship of the general Marcos Pérez Jiménez promoted european immigration to his depopulated country, and more than 300,000 Italians emigrated to Venezuela where flourished under his administration because he had started many urban infrastructure projects thanks to the revenues of oil exportation. There were ample opportunities to work in construction developments, and as a result the economic stance increased within its cities, especially Caracas, Valencia, Barquisimeto and Maracaibo. The Electoral Law of 1957, which allotted to foreigners voting rights for the very first time, became a detrimental event for the Italian communities in Venezuela. The law was put into place by General Pérez Jiménez, to aid him in his reelection campaign. The loss of Perez Jimenez in the presidential referendum meant that his social programs would end, and a huge gap in leadership would follow.

The Italian immigrants had notably supported President Perez Jimenez’s referendum of December 2 of 1957, as well as expressing public adherence to the dictatorship by about 75,000 Italians liderated by the entrepreneur Filippo Gagliardi.  And so, when the General Perez Jimenez fell from power in January 23 of 1958 the hostile attitude of the provisional military government towards the removed president was also reflected on the groups who were supportive of him. For this reason, many migrants and their families chose to return to Italy through the following year, subsiding towards the end of February, when the Minister of Foreign Affairs recognized the potential damage of this shift and proceeded to guarantee security to the remaining Italians in Venezuela. This is a relevant factor, since acts of disdain towards the Italian populace undoubtedly affected the decisions of that ethnic group in regards to choosing to leave or enter the country.

The Italians in the 1961 Venezuelan census were the biggest European community in Venezuela (ahead of the Spanish).

In 1966, according to the Italian Embassy in Caracas, of the 170,000 Italians present in the country, 90% lived in the main cities: about 96,000 in Caracas, 14,000 in Maracaibo, 8,000 in Maracay, 6,000 in Valencia and 5,000 in La Guayra. Most of these Italians were born in Sicily, Campania and Puglia; only 15% were born in northern Italy (mainly in Emilia-Romagna). They initially worked in construction, in the service sector, in commercial agencies and in different businesses (like hotels, banks, restaurants, etc.), in manufacturing activities (the shoe industry in Caracas, for example, was fully in Italian hands) and a few also in the oil industry.

In 1976 the "Dirección de Estadísticas" of Venezuela registered 210,350 Italians residents and 25,858 Italians "naturalised" (who had obtained Venezuelan citizenship). In 2001, 126,553 Italians were living in Venezuela.

Marisa Vannini calculated that in the 1980s Italian-Venezuelans made up almost 400,000 of Venezuela's population, including second-generation descendants of immigrants.  The Italian language in Venezuela is influencing Venezuelan Spanish with some modisms and loanwords and is experiencing a notable revival between the Italian-Venezuelans of second and third generation.

Santander Laya-Garrido estimated that the Venezuelans with at least one grandparent from Italy can be nearly one million at the beginning of the 21st century (like the former president of Venezuela, Raul Leoni, whose grandfather was an Italian mason refugee of the 19th century).

Currently, Italian citizens resident in Venezuela are reduced to less than 50,000 due mainly to demographic mortality and to their return to Italy (because of a Venezuelan political and economic crisis in the 2000s). The Ambassador of Italy in Venezuela, estimated that 5–6% (1.44 to 1.73 million) of the current Venezuelan population is of Italian origin.

Professions
Initially, agriculture was one of the main activities of the Italian community in Venezuela. In the 1950s, entire Italian families were moved from Italy to special agricultural areas, like the "Colonia Turén" of the Portuguesa region.

However, most Italians concentrated in commercial, building and services activities during the second half of the 20th century. In those sectors, Italians reached top positions in the Venezuelan economy.

The community's main Italian newspapers are Il Corriere di Caracas and La Voce d'Italia , both published in the Capital, and the main Italian school is the Agustin Codazzi of Caracas (with courses from elementary to high school). Since 2002, the Italian government has become the promoter for a provision which makes it mandatory to teach the Italian language as a second language in a consistent number of public and private schools within Venezuela.

Most of the Italian community in Caracas but even in the rest of Venezuela followed Deportivo Italia football club, as its own representative team.

Indeed, the Italian-Venezuelans have obtained significant results in the contemporary society of Venezuela. The Italian Embassy calculates that 1/4 of the Venezuelan industries, not related to the oil sector, are directly or indirectly owned and/or managed by Italian-Venezuelans.

In the Italian community, actually one of the most important in Venezuela, there are Presidents of Venezuela (like Jaime Lusinchi and Raúl Leoni), entrepreneurs (like ing. Delfino, who with his "Constructora Delpre" made in Caracas the tallest skyscrapers of South America: Parque Central Complex), managers (like Pompeo D'Ambrosio), sportsmen (like Johnny Cecotto), artists (like Franco De Vita), beauty pageants (like Daniela di Giacomo and Viviana Gibelli), and many others personalities.

One winner of the title Miss Venezuela was born in Italy: María Antonieta Cámpoli in 1972 (later she represented Venezuela in the Miss Universe, where she was the runner-up).

Main Italo-Venezuelan Institutions and Associations

 Asociación Civil "Agustin Codazzi" in Caracas
 Casa de Italia in Caracas, Maracay, Valencia, Ciudad Bolívar
 Centro Italo-Venezolano in Caracas, Barcelona, Maracaibo, Valencia
 Club Social Italiano in Puerto La Cruz, Acarigua, Calabozo
 Deportivo Italia Football Club
 Instituto Italiano de Cultura in Caracas
 Camera di Commercio, Industria ed Agricoltura Venezuelana-Italiana in Caracas
 Regional Associations of Italians in Venezuela
 Genealogía Italiana en Venezuela

Education
The Colegio Agustín Codazzi in Caracas is an overseas Italian school recognized by the Ministry of Foreign Affairs of Italy.

There are also multiple Italo-Venezuelan schools in the country:

Caracas:
Colegio Agustín Codazzi
 Colegio San Francisco d'Assisi
 Colegio Nuestra Señora de Pompei
 Colegio Amerigo Vespucci
 Collegio San Marco Evangelista
 Collegio Patria
 Colegio Bolivar y Garibaldi

Eastern Venezuela:
 Collegio Maria Montessori in Ciudad Bolivar
 Collegio Angelo de Marta in Puerto La Cruz

Western Venezuela:
 Collegio R. C. Agazzi in Barquisimeto
 Collegio San Pedro in Barquisimeto
 Collegio Juan XXIII in Maracay
 Collegio Antonio Rosmini in  Maracaibo
 Unidad Educativa Juan XXIII in Cabimas

Geographical distribution and origin

The Italians who migrated to Venezuela came mainly from the regions of South Italy, like Abruzzo, Campania, Sicily, and Apulia, but there were also migrants from the north, such as from Emilia-Romagna and Veneto.

The Italian Consulate in Caracas stated that in 1977, of 210,350 Italians residents in Venezuela, 39,855 were from Sicily, 35,802 from Campania, 20,808 from Abruzzi, 18,520 from Apulia, 8,953 from Veneto, 7,650 from Emilia-Romagna and 6,184 from  Friuli – Venezia Giulia.

The Italians are concentrated mainly in the north-central region of Venezuela around Caracas. The Consulate stated that in the same 1977 there were 98,106 Italians in the Distrito Federal of Caracas, 39,508 in Miranda State, 14,203 in Maracaibo, 12.801 in Aragua State and 8,104 in Carabobo State, as well as 66 in the Amazonas equatorial region.

In the 2000s, it was determined that nearly 90% of the Italo-Venezuelans were concentrated in the northern coastal section of Venezuela facing the Caribbean sea. Approximately 2/3 of them are residents of the metropolitan areas of the three main Venezuelan cities: Caracas, Maracaibo and Valencia.

There is also a considerable number of Italian residents that live in the city of San Cristóbal and in the Andes region.

Demographics

Population
States with the highest proportions of Italian-born population tend to be those of the North-central coastal area (Capital and Central Region), the Andean Region (Mérida) and the Insular Region.

At the 2011 census, this was the breakdown of Italian-born population by state, showing that the capital area was the one with the biggest concentration of native Italians.

Italian Influences

Language 
Italian was introduced to Venezuela by Italian immigrants, and it now has over 200,000 speakers, making it the country's second most spoken language after Spanish. Italian was widely spoken across the country, specially in the capital "Caracas," "Maracay," and other cities; it is also commonly spoken (mostly by the older generation) by residents of the town of La Carlota, a town in Venezuela which was one of the main settlements for Italians immigrants, regional languages of Italy were also brought to the country such as Neapolitan and Sicilian, Italian is the second language of many Venezuelans of Italian descent after Spanish, also the Italian government has become the promoter of a provision requiring the teaching of Italian as a second language in a constant number of public and private schools within Venezuela.

Cuisine 
Italian cuisine is one of the most influential in the country's every day in fact, Venezuela is the second country in the world with the most consumption of pasta only after Italy itself. Pasta is the third most consumed product in Venezuela, whose per capita consumption is 12.6 kg.

Pasticho (lasagna in Italian) is extremely common dish in Venezuelan Cuisine, Pasticho basically Lasagne is one of the traditional Venezuelan dishes being popular as hallaca, it is consumed in the original form, but also received adaptations, the variants are innumerable, for example, in some, layers of ham are added or the pasta is replaced by banana or by cachapas leafs, a version which is known as chalupa, in others it has been completely modified which involve sauce of chicken or fish, and Pasticho de berenjena which resembles greek Moussaka.

Pizza is one of the most popular dishes in Venezuelan cuisine, pizza has had completely different contrast and variations. L'Associazione Verace Pizza Napoletana has approved Portarossa, a Venezuelan business, for "La margarita," which comprises mozzarella cheese, and "La Marinada," which contains tomato sauce and garlic, as the eighth Latin American pizza certified as Pizza Napolitana by this establesiment,  is an example of the various variants of pizzas in the country; it serves numerous types of pizzas, including "La Pizza Parrilla," which is made with chicken, pork, chorizo, and french fries, as well as Focaccia de Lomito carpaccio.

Polenta originated in Italy originally made from boiled cornmeal. Funche as it is better known in Venezuela, has been incorporated into stews. The typical dish is made with chicken. In the East and West of the country they additionally prepare it with sardines. The typical Polenta of Venezuela is a baked cake made from a mix of precooked corn (Harina P.A.N.), water and salt, stuffed with some meat, chicken, fish or pig stew.

Cannoli is a pastry tube filled with ricotta cheese and honey or chocolate.

Notable Italian-Venezuelans

Architecture 
Jorge Rigamonti – Designed multiple national and international award-winning buildings
Graziano Gasparini – Architect, architectural historian and painter

Musicians 
Benito Canónico – Composer
Rodolfo Saglimbeni – Conductor
Nacho (singer) – Singer
Antonio Lauro – Musician
Franco De Vita – Artist, singer, composer and pianist
Rosario Marciano – Pianist and writer
Pablo Manavello – Composer, guitarist, singer and songwriter
Iván Pérez Rossi – Singer and musician
Alejandra Ghersi – Musician commonly known as Arca (musician)
Yordano – Composer and singer
Humberto Bruni Lamanna – Classical guitarist
Roberto Luti – Singer and record producer
Corrado Galzio – Piano player and founder of cultural radio
Primo Casale – Composer, conductor and violinist
Lele Pons – Singer and internet personality
Jorge Spiteri – Rock musician pioneer
Rudy la Scala – Singer and record producer
Evio Di Marzo Migani – Songwriter and composer
Daniel Calveti – Singer
Gabriel Coronel – Singer
Italo Pizzolante – Composer and musician

Actors and entertainers 
Gioia Arismendi – Actress
Paula Bellini –  TV entertainer
Briggitte Bozzo – Actress
Umberto Buonocuore - Actor
Verónica Ortiz – Actress
Desideria D'Caro – Actress
Viviana Gibelli – Actress and producer
Alejandro Nones - Actor
Jullye Giliberti – Actress
Enrique Sapene - Actor
Fedra López – Actress
Carla Baratta – Actress
Anastasia Mazzone – Actress
Dora Mazzone – Actress
Fanny Otatti –  TV entertainer
Sheyene Gerardi – Actress and producer
Concetta Lo Dolce – Actress
Viviana Gibelli – TV show host and actress
Renny Ottolina – Producer and TV entertainer
Alba Roversi – Actress
Dante Carle – Actor
Irma Palmieri – Actress
Patricia Zavala – TV presenter
Roberto Messuti – Actor
Marisela Berti – Actress
Humberto Tancredi – Actor
Ángel David Revilla – Personality and writer
Andrés Mistage – Actor
Luciano D'Alessandro – Actor
Fernando Carrillo – Actor and singer
Marisa Román – Actress
Wanda D'Isidoro – Actress
Rosanna Zanetti – Actress
Caterinna Valentino – TV hostess
Maria Grazia Bianchi – Actress
Julie Restifo – Actress
Dora Mazzone – Actress
Marjorie Magri – Actress
Claudia La Gatta – Actress
Giancarlo Pasqualotto – Actor
Laura Termini – Actress
Gigi Zanchetta – Actress
Gioia Lombardini – Actress
Mónica Pasqualotto – Actress
Camila Canabal Sapelli – TV hostess
Paula Bevilacqua – Actress
Ainett Stephens – Television personality
Annarella Bono – Actress and TV hostess
Julie Restifo – Actress
Doris Wells – Actress
Carlos Guillermo Haydon – Actor
Luciano D'Alessandro – Actor
Antonio Delli – Actor
Gabriel Coronel – Actor
Sandro Finoglio – Actor
Roberto Lamarca – Actor
Dino D’Avanzo – Chef host TV
Dayana Colmenares – Television personality

Scientists 
Leon Croizat – Biologist
José Del Vecchio – Physician
Francisco De Venanzi – Physician
Santos Dominici – Physician
Francisco Mago Leccia – Ichthyologist
Alejandra Melfo – Physicist
Carlos Alberto Moros Ghersi – Internist
Domingo Luciani – Physician
Olga Gasparini – Sociologist
Luis Razetti – Physician
Milena Sardi de Selle – Psychiatrist
Nora Bustamante Luciani – Physician
Otto Huber – Biologist

Journalists 
Rafael Agostini – Journalist
Gaetano Bafile – Journalist
Enza Carbone– Journalist, TV presenter
Jose Gerbasi– Journalist
Roberto Giusti – Journalist
Nelson Bocaranda – Journalist
Eduardo Rodriguez Giolitti – Journalist
Sergio Novelli – Journalist
Pedro Penzini Fleury – Journalist
Anna Vaccarella – Journalist
Marianela Balbi – Journalist
Silvia Bernardini – Journalist
José Nucete Sardi – Journalist
Miyó Vestrini – Journalist
Pascual Venegas Filardo – Journalist
Ana Vacarella – Journalist
Carlos Henríquez Consalvi – Journalist
Lindsay Casinelli – Journalist
Margarita D'Amico – Journalist
José Visconti– Journalist

Economy 
 Alberto Adriani – Economist
Pompeo D'Ambrosio – Financial manager and vice-president of bank
Calogero Paparoni - Coffee trader
Filippo Gagliardi- Entreprenour
Armando Scannone- Engineer
Filippo Sindoni- Industrialist

Painters 
Juan Vicente Fabbiani – Painter
Francisco Massiani – Writer and painter
Emilio Boggio – Painter
Emilio Jacinto Mauri – Painter

Religious 
 Filippo Salvatore Gilii – Italian Jesuit priest and linguist who lived in the Province of Venezuela before the War of Independence
 Enzo Ceccarelli –

Politicians 
Jaime Lusinchi – President of Venezuela (1984–1989)
Raul Leoni – President of Venezuela (1964–1969)
Agostino Codazzi – Geographer, cartographer, military officer and governor
Carlo Castelli – Italian military that fought with Simon Bolivar in the Venezuelan War of Independence
Juan German Roscio – Lawyer, chief architect of the Venezuelan Constitution of 1811
Rafael Lacava – Governor of Carabobo
Vicencio Scarano Spisso – Politician
Aníbal Dominici – Politician
Otto Hernández Pieretti – Politician
Alberto Carnevali – Politician
Carlos Alberto D'Ascoli – Politician
Mario Masciulli – Military engineer
Francisco Isnardi – Politician
Alberto Franceschi – Politician
José Antonio Velutini – Politician
Diego Alfredo Molero Bellavia – Politician
Simón Alberto Consalvi – Politician

Sports 
Amleto Monacelli – Bowler
Ettore Chimeri – F1 driver
Miguel Mea Vitali – Footballer
Fernando Aristeguieta - Footballer
Rafael Mea Vitali – Footballer
Jaime Moreno Ciorciari – Footballer
Andrés Rouga – Footballer
Jefferson Savarino - Footballer
Sandro Notaroberto - Footballer
Francisco La Mantía - Footballer
Francisco Cervelli – Major League Baseball player
Massimo Margiotta – Footballer
Andres Galarraga – MLB player
Marco Scutaro – MLB baseball player
Gianfranco Di Julio – Soccer player
Giovanni Carrara – Major League Baseball player
Gabriel Cichero – Football defender
José Luis Dolgetta – Footballer
Nahuel Ferraresi – Footballer
Francisco Carabalí – Footballer
Giancarlo Schiavone – Footballer
Matías Lacava – Footballer
Ángel Agnello – Footballer
Ricardo Andreutti – Footballer
Carlos Angelini – Footballer
Gilberto Angelucci – Footballer
Luis Annese – Footballer
Diego Araguainamo – Footballer
Samuel Barbieri – Footballer
Héctor Bidoglio – Footballer
Mauro Cichero – Footballer
Gabriel Cichero – Footballer
Vicente Suanno – Footballer
Yaquino Celli – Footballer
Franco Signorelli – Footballer
Humberto Scovino – Footballer
John Cernicciaro – Footballer
Diego García Veneri – Footballer
Ricardo Mammarella – Footballer
Jorge Casanova – Footballer
Alexander Bottini – Footballer
José Rafael Bottini – Footballer
Daniel Saggiomo – Footballer
Enzo Potolicchio – Racing driver
María Elena Giusti – Swimmer
Andrés Galarraga – Baseball player
Enrico Forcella – Sport shooter
Ernesto Torregrossa - Footballer
Luis Casiani - Footballer
Jefre Vargas - Footballer
Guillermo Vento – Baseball player
Jimy Szymanski – Tennis player
Daniel Canónico – Baseball right-handed pitcher
Giovanni Savarese – Former soccer player
José Antonio Casanova – Baseball manager
María Vento – Tennis player
Rubén Limardo – Fencer
Johnny Cecotto – Sportman (moto & race cars)
Iván Palazzese – Sportman (moto)
Juan Carlos Bianchi – Tennis player
Francisco Limardo – épée fencer
Johnny Cecotto – Moto driver

Beauty queens 
Daniela Di Giacomo – Miss International
Michelle Bertolini – Miss International
Marzia Piazza – Miss Venezuela 1969
Diana Croce – Miss World Venezuela 2016
Debora Menicucci – Miss World Venezuela 
Donatella Bottone – Miss International 
Gabriella Ferrari – Miss World Venezuela 
Jeannette Donzella – Miss Venezuela 1971
Monica Lei – Miss World Venezuela
Faviola Spitale – Miss International
Graciela Guarneri – Miss International 
Fabiola Candosin – Miss World Venezuela
Carolina Cerruti – Miss World Venezuela
Patricia Tóffoli – Miss World Venezuela
Olga Antonetti – Miss Venezuela 1962
María Antonieta Cámpoli – Miss Venezuela 1972
Paola Ruggeri – Miss Venezuela 1983
Adriana Vasini – Miss world Venezuela
Mariam Habach – Miss Venezuela 2015
Mariángela Bonanni - Miss World Venezuela 2010
Valeria Vespoli - Miss Supranational Venezuela

Writers 
Job Pim – Writer
Tulio Chiossone – Writer
Odoardo Crema – Writer
Victoria de Stefano – Writer
Vicente Gerbasi – Writer

See also
 Italian diaspora
 Italian language in Venezuela
 Italy–Venezuela relations
 Corsican immigration to Venezuela
 Deportivo Italia (1948-2010)

References

External links
 Statistical Data on the Italians in the world
 Italian emigration
 Venezuelan 2001 Census:Italians (in Spanish)
 Italiani nel Venezuela (in Italian)

Bibliography
 Cassani Pironti, Fabio. Gli italiani in Venezuela dall’Indipendenza al Secondo Dopoguerra. Roma, 2004
 Favero L. e Sacchetti G. Un secolo di emigrazione italiana: 1876–1976. Centro Studi Emigrazioni. Roma, 1978
 Mille, Nicola. Veinte Años de "MUSIUES". Editorial Sucre. Caracas, 1965
 Santander Laya-Garrido, Alfonso. Los Italianos forjadores de la nacionalidad y del desarrollo economico en Venezuela. Editorial Vadell. Valencia, 1978.
 Vannini, Marisa. Italia y los Italianos en la Historia y en la Cultura de Venezuela. Oficina Central de Información. Caracas, 1966

 
 
Venezuela
Italians